James Campbell Morrison Guy MC (12 June 1894 – ?)  was a Scottish Unionist Party politician.

Guy served during World War I in the Royal Marine Reserve and was awarded the Military Cross for his actions in Belgium. He was elected Member of Parliament (MP) for Edinburgh Central at the 1931 general election, and held the seat until his resignation in 1941 due to ill-health.

References

External links 
 

1894 births
Unionist Party (Scotland) MPs
Members of the Parliament of the United Kingdom for Edinburgh constituencies
Recipients of the Military Cross
Royal Marines officers
UK MPs 1931–1935
UK MPs 1935–1945
Year of death unknown